The Alberta Carbon Trunk Line System (ACTL) is a $CDN1.2 billion,  -pipeline, owned and operated by Enhance Energy and Wolf Midstream, that captures carbon dioxide from industrial emitters in the Alberta's Industrial Heartland and transports it to "central and southern Alberta for secure storage" in "aging reservoirs", and enhanced oil recovery (EOR) projects. The pipeline, which came online on June 2, 2020, is the first and largest carbon capture and storage (CCS) system" in Alberta, Canada.

Background

In September 2010, the Canadian Environmental Assessment Agency (CEAA) approved the project.

The ACTL, which was partially financed through federal government programs and the Canada Pension Plan Investment Board (CPPIB), is owned and operated by Enhance Energy and Wolf Midstream. Funding included up to $CDN305 million from CPPIB, as well as $CDN63 million from the "Government of Canada's "Federal EcoETI Program and the Federal Clean Energy Fund Program". Alberta approved "$CDN223 million in "construction funding" through Alberta's Carbon Capture and Storage Funding Act (2009).

Construction began at the end of 2018, and ACTL went online on June 2, 2020.

In the first phase, ACTL partners—North West Redwater Partnership's (NWRP)   Sturgeon Refinery and Nutrien's Redwater Fertilizer facility in the Heartland—provide "4,400 tonnes per day of high purity " to be transported through the pipeline to the aging Clive Nisku and Leduc field reservoirs.

ACTL has the capacity to transport a maximum of 14.6 million tonnes of  annually.

The third facet of the ACTL project is Enhance Energy's  Enhanced Oil Recovery (EOR) operation. The cost of water management at the Clive legacy oil field—which still held "vast oil reserves"—had closed "oil revenue profit margins". Enhance—which owns and operates both the Clive and Leduc reservoirs—expect to recover 47 million barrels of oil at the Clive field, which represents "between 40 and 50% of the total oil in place."

Government subsidies
Generous public subsidies enabled the launch of the first "oil sands project to capture and bury carbon emissions" in 2015—Royal Dutch Shell's Quest. Both Quest and Carbon Trunk Line's Enhance Energy received hundreds of millions in government financial support for Alberta's two largest carbon capture projects.

The $1.3-billion Quest project at the Scotford complex, located northeast of Edmonton—which became operational in 2015—was almost completely paid for with funding from the Alberta government of $745 million and $120 million from the federal government. At the 2015 Royal Dutch Shell's Quest launch, the provincial government under the Permier Rachel Notley, said at that time it had no further plans to "fund future efforts using the technology." A previous public and private partnership project in 2012, had been forced to cancel "similar plans to retrofit a coal-fired power plant in Alberta, citing the absence of carbon pricing policies". Shell hired the environmental group, the Pembina Institute, to advise them on the Quest project. A Pembina Institute director, Duncan Kenyon, said the "government should strengthen existing carbon pricing to encourage carbon capture."

Whitecap Resources

A similar but much larger project owned and operated by Whitecap Resources, a Canadian Calgary, Alberta-based public oil company founded in 2009—the Weyburn-Midale Carbon Dioxide Project. Emissions from a North Dakota coal power plant and the Dakota Gasification facility are transported to an oilfield in region south of Regina, in neighbouring Saskatchewan—the Weyburn oilfields. Whitecap has operations in Alberta, Saskatchewan, and British Columbia. According to a 2008 article in Canadian Geographic Magazine, at that time the Weyburn carbon monitoring and storage project was the world's largest carbon capture and storage project.

Enhance Energy
By January 2021, Enhance Energy (Enhance) was reporting that it was producing an estimated 200 barrels a day (BOE/D). The company anticipated that carbon capture technology would result in an expanding production of about 4,000 or 5,000 BOE/D. Kevin Jabusch, president and CEO of Enhanced Energy says that since his company is "carbon mitigation company" not an oil company, and would therefore would benefit as the carbon tax increases. Eventually, Enhance would no longer "need to produce oil anymore to be profitable".

References

Pipelines in Alberta
Transport buildings and structures in Alberta